Gnesippus, son of Cleomachus, a Doric lyric poet, according to Meineke, whose light and licentious love verses were attacked by the Athenian comic poets Chionides, Cratinus, and Eupolis. The passages quoted by Athenaeus (παιγνιαγράφου τῆς ἱλαρᾶς μούσης, playful composer) seem to support, however, the opinion of Welcker, that Gnesippus was also a tragic poet, and that the description of his poetry given by Athenaeus  refers to his choral odes, which traditionally were written in a standardized Doric form.

References
(Athen. xiv. p. 638, d. e.; Meineke, Frag. Com. Graec. vol. ii. pp. 7, 27—29 ; Welcker, die Griech. Trag. vol. iii. pp, 1024—1029.) [P. S.]
J. Davidson, 'Gnesippus paigniagraphos: the comic poets and the erotic mime'
The fragments of Attic comedy, Volume 1

Tragic poets
Doric Greek poets
5th-century BC Greek people
Ancient Greek erotic poets
Ancient Greek lyric poets